Mecklenburgh Square is a Grade II listed square in Bloomsbury, London. The square and its garden were part of the Foundling Estate, a residential development of 1792–1825 on fields surrounding and owned by the Foundling Hospital. The square was named in honour of King George III's queen, Charlotte of Mecklenburg-Strelitz. It was begun in 1804, but was not completed until 1825.

It is notable for the number of historic terraced houses that face directly onto the square and the Mecklenburgh Square Garden. Access to the garden is only permitted to resident keyholders, except when it is open to all visitors for Open Garden Squares Weekend.

The garden was laid out between 1809 and 1810 as the centrepiece of the newly developed Mecklenburgh Square; buildings on the eastern side were designed by architect Joseph Kay. The  garden is made up of formal lawns, gravel paths, mature plane trees and other ornamental trees. It contains a children's playground, and a tennis court. The east side of the garden is planted with plants native to New Zealand.

To the west is Coram's Fields, and to the east is Gray's Inn Road, a major local thoroughfare. Goodenough College is a postgraduate residence and educational trust on the north and south sides of the square, and operates an academic-oriented hotel on the east side. Russell Square tube station is located to the south-west of the square, and the railway termini King's Cross and St Pancras are a short walk north.

Mecklenburgh Square, Brunswick Square and Coram's Fields are jointly listed Grade II on the Register of Historic Parks and Gardens.

Notable residents 
 Samuel Parkes (chemist) died here on 23 December 1825.
 Thomas Carlyle and Jane Welsh Carlyle took lodgings at 4 Amport Street, Mecklenburg Square from late Oct 1831 to 25 March 1832. It was here he wrote his acclaimed review of Boswell's Life of Johnson and the brief "Baron Von Goethe" article published in Fraser's magazine (March 1832).
 Karl Pearson lived at no. 40 as a child from 1866 to 1875.
At no. 21 there is a blue plaque for R. H. Tawney (1880 – 1962), historian. In the same doorway is a blue plaque for Sir Syed Ahmed Khan (1817–1898), who lived there from 1869 to 1870.
William Baylebridge lived for a time on Heathcote Street around the year 1909.
At no. 44 there is a plaque (though not an English Heritage one) for H.D. (Hilda Doolittle 1886 – 1961), the American poet, who lived there from 1917 to 1918.
 Helena Normanton, the first practising female barrister, with a number of other legal firsts to her name, is honoured by a blue plaque at no. 22, where she lived during her early legal career.
Jane Ellen Harrison the classicist and linguist lived at no. 11 from 1926 to her death in 1928.
 Virginia Woolf lived at no. 37 from 1939 to 1940.  The house was bombed in a German air raid in 1940 and replaced in 1957 by William Goodenough House at Goodenough College.
 Emanuel Litvinoff poet and writer lived here until his death aged 96
 Eileen Power the medievalist scholar and expert on the lives of medieval women lived on the square from 1922 to 1940.

Gallery

References 

Squares in the London Borough of Camden
Grade II listed parks and gardens in London
Garden squares in London
Communal gardens